Camino (Spanish for "Path") is a census-designated place in El Dorado County, California, and, per the 2010 census, has a population of 1,750. According to the USGS, it lies at an elevation of 3133 feet (955 m).

Nearby cities and towns include Pollock Pines, Placerville, Diamond Springs, El Dorado, Grizzly Flats, Somerset, Coloma, Garden Valley, Cameron Park, Shingle Springs, and Lotus. The elevation of Camino ranges between 3,000 and 3,500 feet, and gets snow several times per year. Camino is a popular area in the fall for apples and is often incorrectly mistaken as Apple Hill, which is the trademarked name of the Apple Hill Growers Association, a 55-member collection of ranches in Camino/Placerville/Pollock Pines. It is also known for its many Christmas tree farm ranches and is home to the annual Apple Hill Run. Camino is located about halfway between Sacramento and South Lake Tahoe on U.S. Route 50. The first post office was opened in 1904; the ZIP code is 95709. The community is inside area code 530.

Demographics

The 2010 United States Census reported that Camino had a population of 1,750. The racial makeup of Camino was 1,604 (91.7%) White, 7 (0.4%) African American, 14 (0.8%) Native American, 18 (1.0%) Asian, 4 (0.2%) Pacific Islander, 55 (3.1%) from other races, and 48 (2.7%) from two or more races. Hispanic or Latino of any race were 197 persons (11.3%).

The Census reported that 1,750 people (100% of the population) lived in households, 0 (0%) lived in non-institutionalized group quarters, and 0 (0%) were institutionalized.

There were 723 households, out of which 188 (26.0%) had children under the age of 18 living in them, 390 (53.9%) were opposite-sex married couples living together, 50 (6.9%) had a female householder with no husband present, 45 (6.2%) had a male householder with no wife present.  There were 50 (6.9%) unmarried opposite-sex partnerships, and 3 (0.4%) same-sex married couples or partnerships. 181 households (25.0%) were made up of individuals, and 76 (10.5%) had someone living alone who was 65 years of age or older. The average household size was 2.42.  There were 485 families (67.1% of all households); the average family size was 2.90.

The population was spread out, with 370 people (21.1%) under the age of 18, 111 people (6.3%) aged 18 to 24, 329 people (18.8%) aged 25 to 44, 560 people (32.0%) aged 45 to 64, and 380 people (21.7%) who were 65 years of age or older.  The median age was 47.8 years. For every 100 females, there were 98.4 males.  For every 100 females age 18 and over, there were 98.0 males.

The homeowner vacancy rate was 2.3%; the rental vacancy rate was 7.4%.  1,235 people (70.6% of the population) lived in owner-occupied housing units and 515 people (29.4%) lived in rental housing units.

Politics

Climate
The Köppen Climate Classification subtype for this climate is "Csa"(Mediterranean Climate).

References

Census-designated places in El Dorado County, California
Populated places established in 1904
Census-designated places in California